Dembel is a town in central Ethiopia. Located in the Shinile Zone of the Somali Region. It is the administrative center of Dembel woreda.

Overview 
Inhabitants of this woreda have engaged in crop farming since 1965; however, there has been a great decline in crop production from 1989 to 2001. That was primarily caused by clan conflicts and aggravated by severe droughts. Between 35-45% of the inhabitants are pastoralists, while 55-65% raise cereals (mostly sorghum) as well as raise livestock.

Demographics 
This town is primarily inhabited by the Makahiil Gadabuursi subclans of the Dir clan family.

The Research-inspired Policy and Practice Learning in Ethiopia and the Nile region (2010) states that the Dembel district is predominantly Gadabuursi:
"Mainly Somali Gurgura, Gadabursi and Hawiye groups, who inhabit Erer, Dambal and Meiso districts respectively."

References 

Populated places in the Somali Region